Kevin Colls (23 April 1922 – 12 October 2009) was  a former Australian rules footballer who played with Richmond in the Victorian Football League (VFL).

Notes

External links 		
		
		
		
		
		
		
		
1922 births		
2009 deaths		
Australian rules footballers from Victoria (Australia)
Richmond Football Club players